P.A.O.K. B.C. (Πανθεσσαλονίκειος Αθλητικός Όμιλος Κωνσταντινοπολιτών, Panthessaloníkios Athlitikós Ómilos Konstantinopolitón, "Pan-Thessalonikian Athletic Club of Constantinopolitans"), commonly known in European competitions as PAOK, is the professional basketball department of the major Greek multi-sports club A.C. PAOK, which was founded in 1926, and is based in Thessaloniki. The club's basketball section was founded in 1928. The club's home arena is the PAOK Sports Arena, which is an indoor arena with a seating capacity of 8,142 people. 

Over the years, the PAOK basketball club has established itself with a firm reputation in Greek pro basketball, especially due to its successes in European-wide competitions. In the past, the club has won Greece's top-tier level Greek Basket League twice, in the years 1959 and 1992. The club has also won the top national Greek Cup competition three times, in the years 1984, 1995, and 1999.

In Pan-European competitions, PAOK has also won two European Cup titles. They won the now defunct European-wide secondary level competition, the FIBA Saporta Cup, in the 1990–91 season. They also won the now defunct European-wide third level competition, the FIBA Korać Cup, in the 1993–94 season. In addition, PAOK was the FIBA Saporta Cup Finals' runner-up in both the 1991–92 and 1995–96 seasons. On the European-wide top-tier level, PAOK competed in the EuroLeague's concluding championship tournament, the Final Four, at the 1993 Athens EuroLeague Final Four, where they finished in third place.

History

1928–1980

The men's basketball section of the multi-sports club PAOK AC was created in 1928, when Alekos Alexiadis, a young member of the administration council of PAOK AC (founded in 1926), took the initiative to create a men's basketball team. He "gave birth" to the basketball department again, after World War II. After the war, Alekos Alexiadis began to organize a basketball team from the children that played at the only basketball court in Thessaloniki. The first honor for PAOK's basketball section was the win of the 1958–59 Greek League championship. The team was crowned the Champions of Greece, with the following players; Dapontes, Kyriakou, Oikonomou, Paschalis, Stalios, Kokkos, Theoridis, Angelidis, Stergiou, Konstantinidis, and player-coach Irakleios Klagas. The next year, PAOK competed for the first time in a European-wide competition and was eliminated in the first round of the European Champions Cup by the Romanian champions CCA București. Three years later, the Greek League was reconstructed into a Nation-wide League, but PAOK was placed in the Second National Division, where they won an immediate league promotion to the first division the next year. The worst season of the club to date was in 1976–77, when PAOK avoided relegation, with a 66–53 play-out win over Dimokritos.

1981–1990
PAOK met Panathinaikos in its first Greek Cup Final, in 1982. The Athenians managed to scrape through to a two-point victory, despite the game being played in Alexandreio Melathron, which was PAOK's home arena at that time. In the following 1982–83 season, the team finished in second place behind Aris.

The success of both Aris and PAOK, fueled the ongoing rivalry between the clubs, that had long been established in football. In 1984, the two teams reached the Greek Cup Final. PAOK's head coach at that time, Faidon Matthaiou, in trying to boost his team's morale, ordered the players to completely shave their heads. PAOK won the Greek Cup by four points (74–70), in what is now remembered as the "final of the shaven heads".

The then 22-year-old Bane Prelević, debuted with the club in the 1988–89 season. He became the definitive leader of PAOK, and a fan favorite. He was often compared to the great Nikos Galis, who was at the time the captain of Aris. Prelević was often quoted for his loyalty to the team. He had a number of injuries and medical emergencies because of weak legs, but he would constantly choose to take heavy dosages of painkillers, rather than missing out on important games. During the 1980s decade, PAOK was second in the Greek League only to Aris.

1991–2000
PAOK won the now defunct European second-tier level FIBA European Cup Winners' Cup's (Saporta Cup's) 1990–91 season championship, when PAOK defeated the Spanish ACB League club CAI Zaragoza in Geneva, by a score of 76–72, on March 26, 1991. On April 10, after the defeated Greek Cup final against Panionios in Piraeus, a car with PAOK supporters were violently attacked with an improvised molotov cocktail by unknown hooligans on Greek National Road 1. Two people burned alive and other two people were seriously injured, but they survived. The perpetrators were never found. 

In the following 1991–92 season, PAOK once again reached the final of the same competition (then called the FIBA European Cup), but they lost to the Spanish League club Real Madrid Asegurator, by a score of 65–63. The game was heading to overtime, as the two teams were equal at 63 points, when Panagiotis Fasoulas lost the ball to Rickey Brown in the last 2 seconds of the game, and Real Madrid scored an unexpected basket. The same year, PAOK won the Greek League championship, by beating Aris in the league's final four mini stage, and then Olympiacos in the playoff's finals.

In the 1992–93 season, PAOK had a starting five unit of John Korfas, Bane Prelević, Cliff Levingston, Ken Barlow and Panagiotis Fasoulas, and was led by head coach Dušan Ivković. In that season, the club competed in Europe's premier club basketball competition, the FIBA European League (now called EuroLeague), which marked the club's first appearance in the top-tier level European league. PAOK reached the 1993 Athens Final Four. PAOK lost in the semifinal game to the then defending Italian League champions Benetton Treviso, which was led by the Croatian star Toni Kukoč, by a score of 79–77. Two days later, in the third-place game, PAOK defeated Spain's Real Madrid Teka, which was led by the Lithuanian star Arvydas Sabonis and American Rickey Brown.

In the 1993–94 season, PAOK returned to European success, by winning the European third-tier level FIBA Korać Cup competition, in a two-legged final against the Italian League club Stefanel Trieste. PAOK won both at home and away, by 9 points. The following year, PAOK won the Greek Cup title, in a 19-point victory against Chipita Panionios, by a score of 72–53. In the 1995–96 season, PAOK once again reached the final of the FIBA European Cup (Saporta Cup), but they lost to the Spanish club Taugrés, by a score of 88–81. Three years later in 1999, PAOK again won the Greek Cup title, by defeating AEK Athens, by a score of 71–54.

The new home of PAOK, the PAOK Sports Arena, able to hold 8,500 fans, was inaugurated on 17 March 2000. That marked the end of a long period of time, in which the club had shared the home court of Alexandreio Melathron with Aris. Bane Prelević returned to PAOK, after having quick spells at Kinder Bologna and AEK Athens, and then quit playing basketball at the end of the 1999–00 season. He later returned to PAOK in the 2001–02 season, as an assistant coach.

During the 1990s decade, PAOK was one of the top teams in the Greek League. They won the Greek League championship in 1992, and also played in the league's finals in 1994, 1998, and 2000. In addition to that, PAOK also made it to the league's semifinals each year, and they finished in 3rd place in the Greek league 1993, 1997, and 1999.

2001–2010
PAOK played in EuroLeague Basketball's inaugural 2000–01 season, where they made it to the Round of 16, and lost to the Slovenian League club Union Olimpija. However, a difficult financial situation led the previous season's Greek League finalists to struggle in the Greek League, where they finished in 8th place in the 2000–01 Greek League season. In the 2001–02 season, PAOK again finished in 8th place in the Greek League. Prelević became the team's head coach for the 2002–03 season, and he led them to a short winning streak during the year. PAOK ended up in 7th place in the Greek League in the 2002–03 season. PAOK also competed in FIBA-organized Pan-European club competitions at that time. They competed in the European third-level 2001–02 FIBA Korać Cup, and in the European third-level 2002–03 FIBA Europe Champions Cup (EuroChallenge).

PAOK finished in 6th place in the 2003–04 Greek League season, with a squad full of talented young players, like Panos Vasilopoulos, Kostas Vasileiadis and Loukas Mavrokefalidis. During the season, PAOK withdrew from FIBA-run competitions, and in the 2004–05 season, the team made its debut in the European-wide secondary level ULEB Cup (EuroCup) competition. PAOK made it to the ULEB Cup's quarterfinals that season, where they lost to the Lithuanian League club Lietuvos Rytas. In the Greek League, PAOK finished in 6th place. In the 2005–06 season, PAOK finished in 6th place in the Greek League.

During a 2006–07 Greek League season game, PAOK and Aris put on a spectacular show, that PAOK ended up winning, after two overtime periods. The team finished that season's Greek League in 6th place, after losing to Olympiacos in the league's playoffs. PAOK also played in the ULEB Cup (EuroCup) in the 2006–07 season. They made it to the league's Top 16 Round that season, where they lost to the Italian League club Montepaschi Siena. 

The 2007–08 Greek League season was one of the worst in PAOK's history, with PAOK finishing in a disastrous 12th place in the league. However, during that Greek League season, PAOK picked up a great victory against Olympiacos. In that same 2007–08 season, PAOK also had a disappointing finish in the now defunct European-wide third- level competition, the FIBA EuroCup (EuroChallenge). Because of that, PAOK's management decided for the club to take a break from Pan-European leagues, and to instead focus mainly on the Greek League. So the club did not compete in any European-wide leagues in the following 2008–09 and 2009–10 seasons. 

PAOK finished in 7th place in the 2008–09 Greek League season. Prior to the start of the 2009–10 season, PAOK hired Soulis Markopoulos to be the team's new head coach. PAOK finished in 5th place in the 2009–10 Greek League season.

2010–2020
PAOK finished 3rd place in the Greek League in the 2010–11 season. That success allowed PAOK to play in the EuroLeague's qualifying tournament in the 2011–12 season. However, in the 2011–12 season, PAOK finished in a disappointing 8th place in the Greek League, and thus missed out on European-wide competition for the 2012–13 season. In the 2012–13 season, PAOK finished in 5th place in the Greek League, and was then able to return to European competition for the following season. In the next season, they competed in the 2nd-tier level EuroCup. In the Greek League, PAOK finished in 3rd place, in both the 2013–14 and 2014–15 seasons. In the 2015–16 season, PAOK finished in 5th place in the Greek League. After the 2015–17 FIBA–Euroleague Basketball controversy, PAOK decided to return to FIBA organized competitions, and chose to play in the FIBA Champions League, rather than in the EuroCup. After finishing in 5th place in the Greek League in the 2016–17 season, the club replaced head coach Soulis Markopoulos with Ilias Papatheodorou. In the 2017–18 season, PAOK finished in 3rd place in the Greek League. The 2019–20 season was the worst on PAOK history because PAOK finished in the last place of Greek basketball league; but due to COVID-19 pandemic, it wasn't relegated.

2020–present
2020–21 PAOK started the new decade from the scratch, with a new contributor Mr.Thanasis Chatzopoulos, PAOK kept the team's leader Vangelis Margaritis, brought in some talented young players such as Elijah Mitrou-Long and gave more playing time to athletes from his academy, like Konstantinos Iatridis. These changes seem to be the first step in returning to the higher positions of the Greek League, as well as a steady comeback to European competitions.

Arenas
In earlier times, PAOK played its home games at the Thessaloniki Forum. After that, PAOK played its home games for many years at the 5,183 seat Alexandreio Melathron (Nick Galis Hall). In 2000, the club moved to the 8,500 seat PAOK Sports Arena.

Roster

Depth chart

Honours

Domestic competitions
 Greek League
 Winners (2): 1958–59, 1991–92
 Runners-up (8): 1959–60, 1987–88, 1988–89, 1989–90, 1990–91, 1993–94, 1997–98, 1999–00
 Greek Cup
 Winners (3): 1983–84, 1994–95, 1998–99
 Runners-up (5): 1981–82, 1988–89, 1989–90, 1990–91, 2018–19

European competitions
 EuroLeague
 3rd place (1): 1992–93
 Final Four (1): 1993
 FIBA Saporta Cup (defunct)
 Winners (1): 1990–91
 Runners-up (2): 1991–92, 1995–96
 Semifinalists (1): 1989–90
 FIBA Korać Cup (defunct)
 Winners (1): 1993–94

Individual honours 

FIBA Hall of Fame
Dušan Ivković
Panagiotis Fasoulas 
50 Greatest EuroLeague Contributors
Dušan Ivković
Greek Basket League MVP
Peja Stojaković (1997–98)
Greek League Top Scorer
Rawle Marshall (2010–11)
Greek League Top Rebounder
Panagiotis Fasoulas (1986–87)
Keith Clanton (2016–17)

Greek League Assist Leader
John Korfas (1989–90)
Frankie King (1998–99)
Damir Mulaomerović (2003–04, 2004–05)
D. J. Cooper (2013–14)
Greek League Coach of the Year
Soulis Markopoulos (2013–14)
Greek Cup MVP
Bane Prelević (1994–95)
Walter Berry (1998–99)

European record

International record

The road to the European Cup victories

1990–91 FIBA European Cup Winners' Cup
{| class="wikitable" style="text-align: left; font-size:95%"
|- bgcolor="#ccccff"
! style="color:white; background:black;"|Round
! style="color:white; background:black;"|Team
! style="color:white; background:black;"|  Home   
! style="color:white; background:black;"|  Away  
|-
|2nd
| Sunderland Saints
|align="center"|97–85
|align="center"|96–89
|-
|rowspan=3|QF
| CAI Zaragoza
|align="center"|112–102
|align="center"|64–70
|-
| Crvena zvezda
|align="center"|91–80
|align="center"|75–91
|-
| Hapoel Galil Elyon
|align="center"|107–77
|align="center"|79–80*
|-
|SF
| Dynamo Moscow
|align="center"|95–82
|align="center"|63–75
|-
|F
| CAI Zaragoza
|colspan=2 align="center"|76–72
|}
 The game was held at Peristeri Arena, in Peristeri, Athens1993–94 FIBA Korać CupSeason-by-season
Scroll down to see more.

Notable players

Greece
  Vangelis Alexandris
  Georgios Balogiannis
  Nikos Boudouris
  Kostas Charalampidis
  Vassilis Charalampopoulos
  Dimos Dikoudis
  Panagiotis Fasoulas
  Nikos Filippou
  Ioannis Gagaloudis
  Nasos Galakteros
  Giannis Giannoulis
 - Steve Giatzoglou
  Memos Ioannou
  Lefteris Kakiousis
  Takis Karatzoulidis
  Manthos Katsoulis
  Nestoras Kommatos
 - John Korfas
  Takis Koroneos
  Angelos Koronios
  Panagiotis Liadelis
  Georgios Makaras
  Achilleas Mamatziolas
  Sotiris Manolopoulos
  Vangelis Margaritis
  Loukas Mavrokefalidis
  Lazaros Papadopoulos
 - Pete Papachronis
  Efthimios Rentzias
  Georgios Sigalas
  Sofoklis Schortsanitis
  Nikos Stavropoulos
  Christos Tsekos
  Apollon Tsochlas
  Kostas Vasileiadis
  Panagiotis Vasilopoulos

USA
  Rafael Addison
  Victor Alexander
  Wendell Alexis
  Ken Barlow
  Walter Berry
  Anthony Bonner
  Matt Bullard
  Anthony Cook
  D. J. Cooper
  Bill Edwards
  Lawrence Funderburke
  Phil Goss
  Will Hatcher
  Mike Jones
  Frankie King
  Cliff Levingston
  Jermaine Love
  Conrad McRae
  Jerrod Mustaf
  Mark Payne
  Kasib Powell
 - Ron Rowan
  Trevor Ruffin
  Charles Shackleford
  Scott Skiles
 - Bill Varner
 - Darius Washington
  C.J. Watson

Europe
  Martynas Andriuškevičius
 - Sergei Bazarevich
  Claudio Coldebella
  Tomas Delininkaitis
  Mamoutou Diarra
  Peja Drobnjak
  Todor Gečevski
  İbrahim Kutluay
  Branko Milisavljević
  Juan Antonio Morales
 - Damir Mulaomerović
 - Rasho Nesterovič
  Žanis Peiners
 - Bane Prelević
  Zoran Savić
  Vlado Šćepanović
  Blagota Sekulić
 - Peja Stojaković
  Dejan Tomašević

South America
 - Rawle Marshall

Africa
  Mamadou N'Diaye

 Oceania
  Matt Nielsen
  Steve Leven

Club captains

P.A.O.K. B.C. team captains, since the 1979–80 season:

Head coaches

This is a list of P.A.O.K.. B.C. head coaches since the 1957–58 season:

Sponsorships
Great Sponsor: Village CinemasOfficial Sponsor: CYTAOfficial Supporter: Makedonia Palace, LouxSee also
 P.A.O.K. women's basketball
 Thessaloniki Forum

References

Sources
 ESAKE Official Website 
 Eurobasket PAOK BC Page
 Galanis Sports Data

External links

PAOK B.C. Official Website 
PAOK Thessaloniki History – PAOK Thessaloniki History Provided On Behalf Of Melbourne Club PAOK
PAOKworld- Most informative PAOK Thessaloniki Forum 
PAOKmania – PAOK Thessaloniki Supporters Downloads, Radio and News 
Press
PAOK24 Media'''
Official YouTube channel

PAOK
P.A.O.K. BC
1928 establishments in Greece
PAOK
Sports clubs in Thessaloniki